The 1988 Edmonton Eskimos season was the 31st season for the team in the Canadian Football League and their 40th overall. The Eskimos finished the season in first place with an 11–7 record. They appeared in the West Final where they lost to the BC Lions.

The Eskimos offense had 496 points for, while the defense had 445 points allowed.

Off-season

CFL Draft

Regular season

Standings

Season Schedule

Total attendance: 276,715 
Average attendance: 30,746 (51.2%)

Statistics

Punt Returns

Kickoff Returns

Missed Field Goal Returns

Awards
CFLPA's Most Outstanding Community Service Award - Hector Pothier (OT)
Norm Fieldgate Trophy - Danny Bass (LB)

Playoffs

Schedule

Bracket

References

Edmonton Elks seasons
Edmonton Eskimos Season, 1988
Edmonton Eskimos